The 1980 Grand Island tornado outbreak, also known as The Night of the Twisters, was a tornado outbreak that produced a series of destructive tornadoes that affected the city of Grand Island, Nebraska, on Tuesday, June 3, 1980. Seven tornadoes touched down in or near the city that night, killing five people and injuring 200.

The name generally referred to by Grand Island area residents for the event, "The Night of the Twisters", comes from the semi-fictionalized book of the same name, loosely based on the June 3rd, 1980 tornadoes, by author Ivy Ruckman, which in turn inspired a made-for-TV movie of the same name that premiered on The Family Channel (now Freeform) in February 1996. While the outbreak is best known for the Grand Island tornado family on June 3, the event as a whole produced 29 tornadoes across two days, causing severe damage as far east as Pennsylvania. In addition to the five deaths that occurred in the Grand Island area, the outbreak injured a total of 413 across seven states.

Outbreak description

The outbreak began on June 2, producing strong tornadoes in Iowa, Indiana, and Ohio, including one that struck the east side of Indianapolis. One fatality occurred near Crawfordsville, Indiana. Tornado activity continued on June 3, with additional strong tornadoes touching down in Pennsylvania, Maryland, West Virginia, and Nebraska. Over a span of three hours on the evening of June 3, 1980, a slow-moving supercell complex moving across Grand Island, Nebraska, spawned several tornadoes. The resulting outbreak was one of the most unusual in United States history: The supercells moved over the city at only ; of the seven tornadoes, three of them were anticyclonic; and the tornadoes did not move in a straight line, with most looping back over their own path at least once.

Confirmed tornadoes

June 2 event

June 3 event

Aftermath
The tornadoes in Grand Island, Nebraska killed five, injured 200, and caused an estimated more than $285 million (USD) ($1.02 billion 2022 USD) in damage. In Nebraska, Tornado warnings allowed people to get to safety in time, which prevented a higher death toll. The South Locust Street area in Grand Island was hardest hit, struck by the fifth tornado of the night (an F4 tornado). Much of the rubble and debris left by the tornadoes was placed in a landfill that now forms Tornado Hill, a popular biking and sledding spot in Grand Island today.

Fictionalized accounts of the event

Book

In 1984, a semi-fictionalized book version of this significant tornado outbreak by children's author Ivy Ruckman, a native of Nebraska, was released under the title Night of the Twisters. The book told the story of Danny Hatch, a pre-teen and his family, and what happened to them as the event took place.

Television film

The book inspired a made-for-cable television original movie of the same name, that premiered on February 14, 1996, on The Family Channel (now Freeform). The movie version still centered on the Hatch Family and most of the characters in the book were adapted to the film. However, there were several discrepancies from the movie and the book version. The most notable being the town in the movie is changed from Grand Island to the fictional town of Blainsworth, which Ivy Ruckman reportedly was disappointed about as it took some of the reality out of the actual event. Danny's father's name is changed to Jack in the film (played by John Schneider) and is mentioned to be his stepfather as Danny's real father is revealed to have died in a plane crash when Danny was six years old. One somewhat prominent character in the movie was Bob Iverson (played by David Ferry), who was not included in the book.

Danny's mother's occupation is also changed to waitress. The last scene in the film in which the Hatch family tries to outrun a tornado in a car lent to them at a shelter was added specifically for the film and was not in the book, either. Danny and his friend Arthur's (played by Devon Sawa and Amos Crawley) ages are also changed to their mid-teens (though their ages are never mentioned in the film).

See also
 List of North American tornadoes and tornado outbreaks

Notes

References

External links
 NWS Hastings: 1980 Grand Island Tornadoes
 GITwisters.com - special of the Grand Island Independent
 10-11 News Night of the Twisters
 An Engineering Analysis of the Grand Island, Ne. Tornadoes- Institute for Disaster Research, Texas Tech University

Tornadoes of 1980
Tornadoes in Nebraska
Tornadoes in Indiana
Tornadoes in Iowa
Tornadoes in Ohio
Tornadoes in Pennsylvania
Tornadoes in Maryland
Tornadoes in West Virginia
F4 tornadoes by date
Grand Island,1980-06-03
1980 in Nebraska
Disasters in Nebraska
Natural disasters in Nebraska
June 1980 events in the United States
1980 natural disasters in the United States